Reformed Baptist churches are united in their adherence to historical Baptist Confessions of Faith that belong to the Reformed tradition, such as the 1689 Baptist Confession of Faith or the earlier 1644 Baptist Confession of Faith. These churches are congregational in their polity, and adhere to both the Five Solae of the Protestant Reformation and the Five Points of Calvinism. 

Reformed Baptist churches may associate with, be affiliated with, or cooperate/partner with various organizations (associations, fellowships, networks, etc.) of Reformed Baptists churches. The organizations may either be global or organized according to specific regional areas.

Global organizations 
Reformed Baptist organizations that are global in their membership of churches include:
Reformed Baptist Network

Africa 
Sola 5 (Churches in Botswana, Eswatini, Malawi, Mozambique, Namibia, South Africa, Zambia, and Zimbabwe)

Brazil 
Comunhao Reformada Batista do Brasil

India 
Reformed Baptist Fellowship of India

Italy 
Evangelical Reformed Baptist Churches in Italy

Malaysia 
Reformed Baptist Churches Malaysia

North America 
Confessional Baptist Association (formerly the Association of Reformed Baptist Churches of America)
Fellowship of Independent Reformed Evangelicals 
Mid-America Reformed Baptist Association of Churches 
Southeast Association of Confessional Baptists 
Southern California Association of Reformed Baptist Churches
Sovereign Grace Churches
Sovereign Grace Fellowship of Canada
Texas Area Association of Reformed Baptist Churches

New Zealand 
Fellowship of Reformed Baptist Churches in New Zealand

References

External links 
On-line directories that list Reformed Baptist (or Reforming or similarly believing) churches and organizations include:
1689.com | Reformed Baptist Church Directory
1689.com | Reformed Baptist Organization Directory 
Farese.com | Reformed Baptist Church Directory
Church Directory of Founders Ministries
G3min.org (G3 Ministries) | Church Directory
ReformedWiki.com | Reformed Baptist Church Directory
Reformed Baptist denominations
Reformed Baptist
Reformed Baptists denominations